Galila Ron-Feder Amit (born 1949) is an Israeli children books author. She has written 400 books, as well as television and film scripts. She also published a children`s nature magazine, and served as editor of a science magazine for young readers.

Biography 

Galila Ron was born in Haifa, 1949. She studied at the Hebrew Reali School and earned a degree in Bible and Hebrew Literature at the Hebrew University of Jerusalem. After her marriage to Avi Feder ended in divorce, she married Meshulam Amit. She has three children of her own from her first marriage, and ten foster children, taken in from broken homes.

Literary career

Ron-Feder published her first book in 1971. She is the author of many books for children that have become Hebrew classics, among them the Gingi series and Tuli Ta'alooli. In 1972, she began publishing a children`s nature magazine. She was also the editor of a science magazine for young readers.

Awards
A film based on her experiences as a foster mother, To Myself, won First Prize at the Frankfurt Children's Film Festival. In 2008, she received the World Zionist Organization Award for Lifetime Achievement and Social Involvement. In 2018, Ron-Feder was a recipient of the Prime Minister's Prize for Hebrew Literary Works.

Published works 
 The Time Tunnel - a children's adventure series about two Jerusalem children who travel back in time to historical events related to the establishment of the State of Israel.
 International Mission - a children's adventure series about Israeli children who travel to different countries and participate in various missions.
 Ṭaʻut, 1978
 To myself, 1987
 Yesh ishah aḥeret, 1994
 Ziyafnu kol kakh, 1995
 Meshuḥreret la-ʻuf, 1997
 Caro Me Stesso, 1999
 Retsaḥ be-tsameret ha-mishṭarah, 1999
 Ima shel tarmilaʼi : sipur ahavah opṭimi, 2002
 Le journal de Fanny, 2011
 Omrim ahavah yesh : sipuro shel Ḥayim Naḥman Byaliḳ, 2012

References 

1949 births
Living people
Hebrew Reali School alumni
Hebrew University of Jerusalem alumni
Israeli children's writers
Israeli women children's writers
People from Haifa
Recipients of Prime Minister's Prize for Hebrew Literary Works
Israeli magazine editors
Magazine publishers (people)